Cyperus distans, also known as slender cyperus, is a species of sedge native to tropical and subtropical wetlands in sub-Saharan Africa, Asia (India, Indochina, China, Indonesia, Philippines, etc.), Madagascar, New Guinea, Australia, Latin America (from Mexico to Argentina), the West Indies, the southeastern United States (Florida, Georgia, North Carolina) and various oceanic islands.

References

External links
 

distans
Freshwater plants
Plants described in 1782
Flora of Africa
Flora of Asia
Flora of Madagascar
Flora of North America
Flora of South America
Flora of New Guinea
Flora of the Caribbean